Girvan Dempsey (born 2 October 1975 in Dublin) is an Irish former rugby union footballer who played at full back for Leinster and Ireland.

Rugby career
Educated at Terenure College and the National University of Ireland, Dempsey won his first full cap as a replacement against Georgia in November 1998 and scored two tries. He became a first choice player in 2000 and played in all five of Ireland's matches at the 2003 World Cup.

He reached a milestone when winning his 50th cap in the 2004 summer tour's second Test against South Africa, and is currently the joint-fourth most-capped Irish player in history, with nine of his appearances as a winger between 1998 and 2005.

A former Ireland Under-21 and 'A' cap, Dempsey's senior career will probably be most remembered for his try in the left corner at Twickenham in 2004 which helped Ireland on their way to securing their first Triple Crown since 1985.

Most recently he helped Ireland to a 2006 Triple Crown victory in Ireland's 28–24 victory over England and Leinster to their first ever Heineken Cup win. He also won the Celtic League with Leinster.

He has been capped 82 times by Ireland, scoring 95 points(19 tries), putting him 4th on the Irish all-time international try scorer list.
He has been capped 198 times for leinster scoring 184 points.

Dempsey announced that he would retire from rugby union at the end of the 2009–10 season, a week after Leinster were knocked out of the 2009–10 Heineken Cup.

Honours

Ireland
Triple Crown: 2004, 2006, 2007

Leinster
Heineken Cup: 2008–09
Celtic League: 2007–08
Celtic League: 2001–02

References

http://www.irishrugby.ie/squads/ireland_player_search.php

External links
Leinster Rugby profile
Irish Rugby profile
Sporting Heroes profile

1975 births
Irish rugby union players
Ireland international rugby union players
Leinster Rugby players
Leinster Rugby non-playing staff
Terenure College RFC players
Living people
Rugby union players from Dublin (city)
Rugby union fullbacks